Nico-Stéphàno Pellatz (born 8 July 1986) is a German former professional footballer who played as a goalkeeper.

Career
Pellatz was part of Hertha BSC's reserve team since 2004 and signed a professional contract with the club for the 2006-07 season, during which he did not make any appearances in the Bundesliga as the third-choice goalkeeper behind Christian Fiedler and Kevin Stuhr-Ellegaard. Between 2005 and 2007, he made 36 appearances for Hertha's reserve team in the third-division Regionalliga Nord.

In the summer of 2007, he moved to Werder Bremen on a two-year deal for both Bundesliga and Regionalliga squads. He was the third-choice goalkeeper in Werder Bremen's professional squad, behind Tim Wiese and Christian Vander, and did not make any Bundesliga appearances. However, he was a regular at the club's reserve squad, where he also made three appearances in the German Cup.

After being released by Werder Bremen on 10 June 2009, he moved to Cypriot club Apollon Limassol on a two-year deal.

On 13 September 2010, it was announced that Pellatz would join the Dutch club ADO Den Haag. During the January 2011 transfer window, Pellatz moved to Excelsior Rotterdam on loan. The following season, he left Den Haag permanently, moving to Sparta Rotterdam.

On 4 July 2013, it was announced that Pellatz would leave Sparta to sign a two-year-contract with Dynamo Dresden. Six months later he signed for Viktoria Köln after only have been capped for Dresden's reserve team. He left the club on a free transfer since his contract was dissolved by mutual agreement.

After two seasons with VfL Wolfsburg II, Pellatz left at the end of the 2018–19 season where his contract expired.

References

External links
 
 
 

1986 births
Living people
German footballers
German expatriate footballers
Association football goalkeepers
Hertha BSC II players
SV Werder Bremen players
SV Werder Bremen II players
Apollon Limassol FC players
Excelsior Rotterdam players
Sparta Rotterdam players
Dynamo Dresden players
FC Viktoria Köln players
VfL Wolfsburg II players
Eredivisie players
Cypriot First Division players
Expatriate footballers in Cyprus
German expatriate sportspeople in Cyprus
Expatriate footballers in the Netherlands
German expatriate sportspeople in the Netherlands
3. Liga players
Regionalliga players
Footballers from Berlin
German expatriate sportspeople in Slovakia